Paul Mitchel (born Cyril Thomson Mitchell; January 27, 1936 – April 21, 1989) was a Scottish American hairstylist and co-founder of John Paul Mitchell Systems, a company that sells hair care products and, since 2000, also runs hairdressing schools.

Early life
Paul Mitchell was born in Carnwath in Scotland. His mother Jenny was the village's first hairdresser. His family moved to London in 1939. He trained as a silversmith before enrolling in the Morris School of Hairdressing at age sixteen. By eighteen he had won multiple hairdressing competitions.

Career
After graduating he worked as a hairdresser in London salons, moving to Vidal Sassoon's in Bond Street in the early 1960s. In 1965, Sassoon sent him to New York City to train staff at his first location in the United States. Mitchell left Sassoon's employ in 1967 and headed up Crimpers, a salon within the Henri Bendel flagship store on Fifth Avenue. Its success led to further branches opening in Boston, Chicago, Dallas and Philadelphia. In 1971 he took a break from hairdressing before opening his salon Superhair in New York in 1972. In 1974 he sold Superhair and moved to Hawaii. By the end of the 1970s he demonstrated hairdressing techniques at up to 150 beauty shows per year.

In 1980 he and John Paul DeJoria founded John Paul Mitchell Systems, selling hair care products via hair salons under the Paul Mitchell brand name, marketed as professional quality products for home use. The company thrived and later expanded into hairdressing schools.

In 1985, Mitchell established an awapuhi farm on the Big Island of Hawaii.

Personal life
Mitchell married Jolina Zandueta Wyrzykowski, an American fashion model and actress with Polish-Filipina family roots. Their only child, Angus Mitchell, was born in 1970.

On July 18, 1988, Mitchell was diagnosed with pancreatic cancer. He died in 1989 in Cedars Sinai Medical Center. He is buried on his estate on the Big Island of Hawaii. Angus inherited his father's share of John Paul Mitchell Systems & Schools and opened his own salon, AngusM in Beverly Hills, CA.

References

Further reading
Paul Mitchell: Man, Work Vision. Who Was He? Jocelyn Fujii.

External links
John Paul Mitchell Systems | Official website
Paul Mitchell | Official Supplier

American hairdressers
American cosmetics businesspeople
1936 births
1989 deaths
20th-century American businesspeople
California people in fashion
Deaths from pancreatic cancer
People from South Lanarkshire
Scottish emigrants to the United States
20th-century Scottish businesspeople